Ndere Island is a small island in Winam Gulf of Lake Victoria in Kenya. It was gazetted as the Ndere Island National Reserve in November 1986 and has since that time been uninhabited.

Ndere means "meeting place" in Dholuo. According to Luo folklore, early tribal migrants rested up near Ndere after their long journey south up the Nile River Valley. They found the lush shoreline so pleasing that they stayed.

Notable fauna associated with the island include African fish eagles, swifts, hippopotamus, and Nile crocodiles. About fifty impalas have been introduced to the island.

Located on the Lake Victoria, this island is a haven for birds. Covered mostly in grassland, Ndere Island provides beautiful scenic views of the Homa hills to the south, Mageta Island to the east and the glimpses of Kampala in Uganda beyond the south west horizon. The lake shore supports a wide variety of animals including hippos, monitor lizards, Nile crocodiles, several fish species, snakes, baboons, impalas, the rare sitatunga antelopes, water bucks, zebras and warthogs. Over 100 different species of birds can be seen here including African fish eagles, black headed gonoleks and grey headed kingfishers.

References

External links 
Kenya Wildlife Service: Ndere Island National Park

Lake islands of Kenya
Islands of Lake Victoria
National parks of Kenya
Protected areas established in 1986
1986 establishments in Kenya